The Swedish Transport Worker's Union (Transport) is a trade union representing workers in the transport industry in Sweden.

History
The union was created in April 1897 in Stockholm, as a split from the Swedish Heavy and Factory Workers' Union.  It was organised by Charles Lindley.  In 1900, it affiliated to the Swedish Trade Union Confederation.

The union's membership reached 12,300 in 1907, then dropped back.  The Swedish Firemen's Union and Swedish Seamen's Union both split away in 1914, and its membership then began growing.  The Third Machinists' Union joined in 1923, and although the Swedish Automobile Drivers' Union left in 1924, it rejoined in 1927.  The Port Workers' Union split away in 1972, and the Swedish Aviation Engineers' Union left in 1974.  Despite this, membership reached an all-time high of 68,128 in 2005.  It has since declined, and in 2019 stood at 48,694.

The union's motto is: "The collective agreement defends you if you defend the collective agreement!" (Kollektivavtalet försvarar dig om du försvarar kollektivavtalet!).

There are 30 local chapters around Sweden that assists members.  The headquarters are located on Olof Palmes street 29, right across from the so-called LO-castle around Norra Bantorget in Stockholm.

Membership
The union has today 57 000 members who work in many different fields, such as:

 Surveillance and security (Security guards, Airport security personnel, Parking attendants)
 Dockyard workers
 Newspaper delivery
 Advertisement distributors
 Automobile towing
 Tire shops
 Gas stations
 Airport personnel (Loaders, mechanics)
 Road transport

International cooperation
The union also support an active international union cooperation and is a member of several international labor organizations:

 Nordic Transport Workers Federation (NTF)
 European Transport Workers Federation (ETF)
 Union Network International (UNI)
 International Transport Workers' Federation (ITF)

Presidents
1897: Charles Lindley
1937: Ragnar Helgesson
1953: Sigurd Klinga
1961: Helge Pettersson
1968: Hans Ericson
1980: Bertil Gustavsson
1983: Johnny Grönberg
1990s: Hans Wahlström
2002: Per Winberg
2009: Lars Lindgren
2017: Tommy Wreeth

References

Swedish Trade Union Confederation
UNI Global Union
International Transport Workers' Federation
Transport trade unions in Sweden
Trade unions in Sweden
1897 establishments in Sweden
Trade unions established in 1897